Wendell Downswell (born 5 February 1958) the current Jamaica youth national team technical director as well as the technical director of Jamaica

Playing career

High school and college
Downswell was born Savannah-la-Mar, Jamaica. He played for and attended St. Elizabeth Technical High School in Jamaica.  He then completed his degree in Physical Education at G.C. Foster College in Spanish Town, Jamaica. He also pursuing a master's degree at the UWI, Mona.

Professional
Downswell played for Reno F.C. in the Jamaica National Premiere League as a winger.

International
From 1976, Downswell made several appearance for the Jamaica national football team.

Coaching career
Downswell has traveled extensively to the United States, Germany, Paraguay, Brazil and other countries to participate in numerous coaching certifications courses and programs.  He is also currently the lead instructor for the JFF Coaching Program.

St. Elizabeth Technical High School (STETHS) 
In 2007, he also joined the St. Elizabeth Technical High School (STETHS) football coach staff as technical director.

Reno F.C. 
Downswell had been involved in the coaching department of Reno F.C. since 1985.

Jamaica youth national teams
Under the guidance and recommendation of Rene Simoes, Downswell was selected to coach the u20 national team in 2000 and held that position until 2005. In 2001, he coached Jamaica U20 national team at the 2001 FIFA World Youth Championship.  He rejoined the youth national team staff from 2007–2008 and again in 2010. During the 2007 Pan Games in Rio de Janeiro, Brazil, he led his squad to team to a silver medal. In 2010, he led the Jamaica U17 national team tour in São Paulo, Brazil ahead of the 2011 CONCACAF U17 finals. In February 2011, Downswell led Jamaica U17 to a fourth-place finish in the 2011 CONCACAF U-17 Championship Finals and qualification to the 2011 FIFA U-17 World Cup in Mexico, scheduled in June 2011.

Jamaica senior national team 
During his time as national team head coach, he won the 2005 Caribbean Cup title and made the quarterfinals of the 2005 CONCACAF Gold Cup. Downswell also served as an assistant coach in 2007.

In 2017, Downswell was named Director of Football

Personal life
Wendell Downswell's son, Renario, also played at STETHS and played in the youth system of Reno F.C.

Honours
Reno F.C.
 Western Confederation Super League: 2010

Jamaica
 Caribbean Cup: 2005
 Pan American Games: runner-up 2007

References

1958 births
Living people
Jamaican footballers
Association football forwards
Jamaica international footballers
FC Reno players
Jamaican football managers
Jamaica national football team managers